Obasiarinse Idehaloise Uade (born 26 December 1995), commonly known as Arinse Uade, is an English professional footballer who plays as a left back.

In July 2020, he became the first Englishman to sign a contract in Uruguay in the professional era.

Club career
In 2008, Uade joined the academy at Arsenal, after beginning his career at amateur club Norsemen. Uade joined Finnish side SJK in the summer of 2014, playing four times for their B team in the Kakkonen.

After returning to England, he joined Ilkeston Town in January 2015. In December 2015, he returned to the professional game, signing for Norwich City on a deal until the end of the season.

In the summer of 2016, he joined National League South side Eastbourne Borough, playing four matches. He then spent the rest of the year with Lewes, making 15 appearances in all competitions. He finished the season with Tilbury, making five appearances. 

In 2017, Uade played for Isthmian League clubs Harrow Borough and Ashford United. In 2018, Tercera División club Céltiga signed Uade, with Uade making four league appearances for the club, before returning to England to sign for Harlow Town. He went on to make 3 appearances.

At the end of 2019, Uade returned to Finland once again, to join up with RoPS ahead of the 2020 season.

However, before making any appearances for RoPS, Uade became the first Englishman to sign a contract in Uruguay in the professional era when he joined Uruguayan Segunda División side Rampla Juniors. He left the club the following month without making a competitive appearance.

International career
Uade represented Nigeria at under-17 level.

References

External links

1995 births
Living people
English people of Nigerian descent
English footballers
Association football defenders
English expatriate footballers
SJK Akatemia players
English expatriate sportspeople in Finland
English expatriate sportspeople in Spain
Expatriate footballers in Finland
Expatriate footballers in Spain
Expatriate footballers in Uruguay
Norwich City F.C. players
Eastbourne Borough F.C. players
Tilbury F.C. players
Harrow Borough F.C. players
Ashford United F.C. players
Harlow Town F.C. players
Rovaniemen Palloseura players
Rampla Juniors players
Nigeria youth international footballers
Black British sportspeople